The Randal Óg Gaelic Athletic Association club was founded in 1953,and is located in Ballinacarriga, County Cork, Ireland, near Dunmanway in the southwest of the county. The club currently competes at Junior A in Gaelic football and Junior B in hurling. A book entitled "Finding Fifteen, The History of Randal Óg Hurling and Football Club" was published in 2007 to mark the fiftieth anniversary of the founding of the club. The club combines with Dohenys at underage levels of competition. Randal Óg is part of the Carbery division of Cork GAA.

History
The club was founded in 1953, and the club's first major success came in that year with the winning of the Junior B Football title. The club's under-age team was to the forefront in 1956 when they won the West Cork Schools Shields title, and this team was trained by Dennis Cotter NT who continued to foster and train the youth of the area until his retirement in 1982. The Junior B Football title was won again in 1958 with what is reputedly the best team ever fielded by the club. In 1959 the club was unlucky to be defeated in the semi-final of the A grade championship. In 1966, the club entered a hurling team for the first time and since then both hurling and football have been played in the club. In 1973, the club recorded its first double victory, winning the West Cork Under-21 B Football and Hurling championships. In 1976, the Junior B football title was won once again. 
In 1979, the Junior B hurling title was won for the first time. At the County Convention of Cork GAA in 1984, the club successfully put forward a motion to set up a County Junior B Hurling and Football competition.

Honours
Cork Junior B Hurling Championship: Winner (2) 1992, 2000  Runner-Up 1987, 2009
 Cork Junior B Football Championship: Winners 2021; Runners Up 1999
 Millennium Cup (Cork) Junior B Hurling Championship:  Winner (1) 2000
 West Cork Junior B Hurling Championship: Winners (8) 1979, 1987, 1991, 1992, 2000, 2010, 2014, 2017. Runner Up: 1982, 1983, 1985, 1986, 2009, 2012.
 West Cork Junior B Football Championship: Winners (6) 1953, 1958, 1976, 1999, 2010, 2021. Runner Up (4) 1966, 1985, 1986, 2014.
West Cork Under-21 B Hurling Championship: Winners (3) 1973, 1990, 1997 Runners-Up: 1972, 1975, 1985, 1987, 2001
West Cork Under-21 B Football Championship: Winners (1) 1973 Runners-Up: 1972
West Cork Under-21 C Football Championship: Winners (4) 2000, 2003, 2011, 2019 Runners-Up: 2002
West Cork Under-21 C Hurling Championship: Winners (3) 2000, 2003, 2011 Runners-Up: 1996, 2010

References

.

External links

Gaelic games clubs in County Cork
Hurling clubs in County Cork
Gaelic football clubs in County Cork